Lichen striatus  is a rare skin condition that is seen primarily in children, most frequently appearing ages 5–15. It consists of a self-limiting eruption of small, scaly papules.

Symptoms 
Lichen striatus impacts the skin and nails.  It is seen as an unbroken or disrupted, linear band consisting of small tan, pink or flesh colored papules.

The papules could be smooth, flat topped or scaly. The band of lichen striatus varies from a few millimeters to 1-- 2 cm wide and extends from a few centimeters to the complete length of the extremity. By and large, the papules are unilateral and single on an extremity along the lines of Blaschko.

Itching is an accompanying function of the disorder.

Diagnosis
Diagnosis is based on observing the appearance of the lesions.

Management
It is self-limiting condition
1.reassurance
2.steroid cream for local application
3.moisturiser lotion

See also
 Lichen planus
 List of cutaneous conditions

References

External links 

 New England Journal of Medicine - Images of the Week

Lichenoid eruptions